Cas Faber (born 18 June 1999) is a Dutch professional footballer who plays as a midfielder for Eerste Divisie club FC Eindhoven. Having previously played in the Derde Divisie with Jong Groningen, he made his professional debut for FC Eindhoven on 4 October 2019 in a 6–0 defeat away at Jong Ajax. He is the son of Ernest Faber.

Career statistics

References

External links
 
 

1999 births
Living people
Dutch footballers
Association football midfielders
People from Geldrop
Footballers from North Brabant
FC Groningen players
FC Eindhoven players
Derde Divisie players
Eerste Divisie players